Bhander Power Plant is a natural gas-based thermal power plant located near Hazira in Surat district in the Indian state of Gujarat. The power plant was commissioned in 2006 by EPC Construction India Limited (Formerly known as Essar Projects India Limited) and commenced commercial operations in 2008 by the Essar Energy.

On 3 March 2020, ArcelorMittal Nippon Steel India Private Limited has acquired this power plant from Edelweiss Asset Reconstruction Company under Securitisation and Reconstruction of Financial Assets and Enforcement of Security Interest Act, 2002

Capacity
It has an installed capacity of 500 MW. The plant is functional since October 2008.

References

Natural gas-fired power stations in Gujarat
Surat district
Energy infrastructure completed in 2008
2008 establishments in Gujarat
ArcelorMittal
Nippon Steel